The county of Surrey is divided into 11 parliamentary constituencies (sub-classified into four of borough type and seven of county status affecting the level of expenses permitted and status of returning officer).  The county saw the vast bulk of its population and seats removed on the creation of the County of London in 1889 and its wider replacement the county of Greater London in 1965. Reflecting its mainly suburban and rural nature, all seats covering the present definition of Surrey have been held by Conservative MPs at each general election since 1885, with the exception of two Liberals in 1906 and 1 Liberal Democrat in 2001.

Constituencies

Historic list of constituencies in Surrey

Used from 1950 to 1974
Chertsey
Dorking
Epsom
Esher
Farnham
Guildford
Reigate
East Surrey
Spelthorne (previous county: Middlesex abolished in 1965)
Woking

Eleven other seats fell within the north-east of Surrey until 1965, forming the metropolitan part closest to London and the majority of the population (shown in the Historical Representation tables below). These were moved into Greater London leaving a predominantly suburban and rural content.

Used from 1974 to 1983
Chertsey and Walton
Dorking
East Surrey
Epsom and Ewell
Esher
Farnham
Guildford
North West Surrey
Reigate
Spelthorne
Woking

Used from 1983 to 1997
Chertsey and Walton
East Surrey
Epsom and Ewell
Esher
Mole Valley
Guildford
North West Surrey
Reigate
South West Surrey
Spelthorne
Woking

2010 boundary changes
Under the Fifth Periodic Review of Westminster constituencies, the Boundary Commission for England decided to retain the existing 11 constituencies in Surrey, with only very minor changes to four of them.

Proposed boundary changes 
See 2023 Periodic Review of Westminster constituencies for further details.

Following the abandonment of the Sixth Periodic Review (the 2018 review), the Boundary Commission for England formally launched the 2023 Review on 5 January 2021. Initial proposals were published on 8 June 2021 and, following two periods of public consultation, revised proposals were published on 8 November 2022. Final proposals will be published by 1 July 2023.

The commission has proposed that Surrey be combined with Berkshire and Hampshire as a sub-region of the South East Region. As a result, the majority of the abolished constituency of South West Surrey would be combined with parts of the current constituency of East Hampshire to form a new cross-county boundary constituency named Farnham and Bordon. The remainder of South West Surrey would be combined with parts of Guildford, Mole Valley and Surrey Heath to form the new constituency of Godalming and Ash. The communities of Englefield Green and Virginia Water in the borough of Runnymede would be included in the Berkshire constituency of Windsor. Following changes to Mole Valley, it is proposed that this constituency is renamed Dorking and Horley.

The following constituencies are proposed:

Containing electoral wards from Elmbridge

 Esher and Walton
 Runnymede and Weybridge (part)

Containing electoral wards from Epsom and Ewell

 Epsom and Ewell (part)

Containing electoral wards from Guildford

 Guildford
 Surrey Heath (part)
 Godalming and Ash (part)

Containing electoral wards from Mole Valley

 Dorking and Horley (part)
 Epsom and Ewell (part)

Containing electoral wards from Reigate and Banstead

 Dorking and Horley (part)
 East Surrey (part)
 Reigate

Containing electoral wards from Runnymede

 Runnymede and Weybridge (part)
 Windsor (parts also in the Boroughs of Slough, and Windsor and Maidenhead in Berkshire)

Containing electoral wards from Spelthorne

 Spelthorne

Containing electoral wards from Surrey Heath

 Surrey Heath (part)

Containing electoral wards from Tandridge

 East Surrey (part)

Containing electoral wards from Waverley

 Dorking and Horley (part)

 Farnham and Bordon (part also in the District of East Hampshire)
 Godalming and Ash (part)

Containing electoral wards from Woking

 Woking

Results history 
Primary data source: House of Commons research briefing - General election results from 1918 to 2019

2019 
The number of votes cast for each political party who fielded candidates in constituencies comprising Surrey in the 2019 general election were as follows:

Percentage votes 
Note that before 1974 Surrey included a considerable part of what is now London.

1pre-1979 - Liberal Party; 1983 & 1987 - SDP-Liberal Alliance

* Included in Other

Accurate vote percentages cannot be obtained for the elections of 1918, 1922, 1923 and 1931 because at least one candidate stood unopposed.

Seats 

11974 & 1979 - Liberal Party; 1983 & 1987 - SDP-Liberal Alliance

General Election 2019, 2017, 2015 and 2010 results

The following tables show the results for all Surrey constituencies in the General Elections in 2019, 2017, 2015 and 2010. The results are given as percentages.

Maps

1885-1910

1918-1945

1950-1970

1974-present

Historical representation by party
A cell marked → (with a different colour background to the preceding cell) indicates that the previous MP continued to sit under a new party name.

1885 to 1918

Note the 15 other seats of Surrey created in 1885 which primarily or wholly lay in the 1889-created County of London are not included in this list.

1918 to 1950 (12, then 14 MPs)

† denotes seat which falls wholly or largely within present-day county of Greater London.

1950 to 1974 (19, then 20 MPs)

† denotes seat which falls wholly or largely within present-day county of Greater London

1974 to present (11 MPs) 
In 1965 half (ten) of Surrey's constituencies were moved to the new county of Greater London, but constituencies based on the old boundaries continued to be used until 1974, when Surrey gained one constituency (Spelthorne) from the abolished administrative county of Middlesex.

Liberal Democrat MP Sue Doughty, who won Guildford in 2001 with a winning margin of 1.2%, was the first candidate to take a seat from the Conservatives in the area covered by the present county of Surrey in 56 years.

See also
 List of parliamentary constituencies in the South East (region)

Notes

References
The Boundary Commission proposals for Surrey

Surrey
 
Politics of Surrey
Parliamentary constituencies